Lisa Miller may refer to:

Fictional characters
Lisa Miller (24), a character on the TV series 24
Lisa Miller (As the World Turns), a character on the TV series As the World Turns
Lisa Miller (Scott Pilgrim), a character in Scott Pilgrim
Lisa Miller (NewsRadio), a character on the TV series NewsRadio

Others
Lisa Miller (singer-songwriter), Australian singer/songwriter
Lisa Miller (psychologist), clinical psychologist at Columbia University, Teachers College and author of The Spiritual Child
Lisa Miller (journalist) (born 1963), author of Heaven: Our Enduring Fascination with the Afterlife
One of the litigants in Miller v. Jenkins

See also
Lisa Millar, an Australian journalist
Luisa Miller, an opera by Giuseppe Verdi